Zentendorf is a village (Ortsteil) of Neißeaue, in the district Görlitz, Saxony, Germany. Prior to its incorporation into Neißeaue on 1 January 1999, Zentendorf was part of the municipality of Deschka and until 1 July 1950, it was an independent municipality. Zentendorf is the easternmost place in Saxony and Germany.

History
The small village of Zentendorf was first mentioned in 1390 under the name of Cenetindorf. A wide variety of place names have been mentioned for the place in the further course of time. In 1427, it was called Czenthendorf and in 1533 Zenttendorff; in 1560 the place name Centendorf was recorded. In 1791, Zentendorf was first mentioned under its current name. The place name is derived from the Sorbian term for "young dog".

References

Populated places in Görlitz (district)
Former municipalities in Saxony